The AWA Brass Knuckles Championship was a professional wrestling championship owned by the American Wrestling Association (AWA) promotion. The championship was introduced on February 12, 1979, at a Mid-South Coliseum live event. It was active until May 1981 when the title belt was abandoned after Crusher Lisowski left the promotion.

It debuted as a part of a storyline to introduce Don Fargo to the Memphis wrestling territory; this allowed Fargo to challenge various wrestlers in hardcore-themed matches. Like most professional wrestling "brass knuckle" championships, both wrestlers would heavily tape their fists to give the impression that each participant was wearing brass knuckles; the title was generally defended in no-disqualification matches and it was legal to punch an opponent. Fargo and Lisowski were the only champions.

History
The AWA Brass Knuckles Championship was first defended on February 12, 1979, at the Mid-South Coliseum, in a match between Don Fargo and Robert Gibson. Fargo was billed by the promotion as the "World Brass Knuckles Champion", however, the title mostly defended in the Continental Wrestling Association. Together with manager Al Greene, Fargo would use the title to engage in wild brawls with other stars of the Memphis territory. During his 1979-80 run with the CWA and his brother Jackie Fargo were allies of Jerry "The King" Lawler; Fargo also formed tag teams Chris Colt, The Destroyer, and Dennis Condrey. One of his most notable matches as AWA Brass Knuckles Champion was against Jimmy Valiant on September 29, 1980, who defeated Fargo via disqualification. The title was abandoned after Fargo left the Memphis territory at the end of the month.

On October 20, 1980, Crusher Lisowski won the vacant title after defeating "Crusher" Jerry Blackwell in St. Paul, Minnesota. Lisowski defended the title in the American Wrestling Association for five months until leaving the promotion in the summer of 1981, after having suffered a career-ending injury at the hands of Jerry Blackwell, and the title became abandoned once again.

Reigns
Don Fargo was the first champion in the title's history. He also held the record for longest reign at 595 days.

Title history

References

External links
AWA Brass Knuckles Championship at WildcatBelts.com, a photo gallery of the championship belt used by AWA Superstars

American Wrestling Association championships
Unsanctioned championships
2005 in professional wrestling
2006 in professional wrestling
Hardcore wrestling championships